This is a list of 488 species in Cryptorhynchus, a genus of hidden snout weevils in the family Curculionidae.

Cryptorhynchus species

 Cryptorhynchus abbreviatulus Billberg, 1820 c
 Cryptorhynchus abdominalis Schoenherr, 1826 c
 Cryptorhynchus adspersus Dejean, 1821 c
 Cryptorhynchus aequicollis Fiedler, 1941 c
 Cryptorhynchus affaber Boheman, 1844 c
 Cryptorhynchus affinis Sturm, 1826 c
 Cryptorhynchus albicollis Germar, 1848 c
 Cryptorhynchus albifrons Boheman, 1837 c
 Cryptorhynchus albipes Boheman, 1837 c
 Cryptorhynchus albocaudatus Rosenschoeld, 1837 c
 Cryptorhynchus albofasciatus Dejean, 1836 c
 Cryptorhynchus albonotatus Klug, J.C.F., 1829 c g
 Cryptorhynchus alboscapularis Fiedler, 1941 c
 Cryptorhynchus alboscutosus Fiedler, 1941 c
 Cryptorhynchus albosparsus Fiedler, 1941 c
 Cryptorhynchus alpinus Gistl, J., 1831 c
 Cryptorhynchus alternans Dejean, 1821 c
 Cryptorhynchus altifrons Fiedler, 1941 c
 Cryptorhynchus amictus Boheman, 1844 c
 Cryptorhynchus amoenus Dejean, 1821 c
 Cryptorhynchus amplicollis Boheman, 1844 c
 Cryptorhynchus anaglypticus Say, 1831 c
 Cryptorhynchus anceps Boheman, 1837 c
 Cryptorhynchus annosus Scudder, S.H., 1876 c g
 Cryptorhynchus annulatus Fiedler, 1941 c
 Cryptorhynchus antares Erichson, 1842 c
 Cryptorhynchus antiquus Erichson, 1842 c
 Cryptorhynchus apicalis Klug, J.C.F., 1829 c g
 Cryptorhynchus apicatus Germar, 1824 c
 Cryptorhynchus apicipennis Lea, 1913 c
 Cryptorhynchus apiculatus Gyllenhal, 1837 c
 Cryptorhynchus arachnodes Erichson, 1834 c
 Cryptorhynchus aratus Germar, 1824 c
 Cryptorhynchus areneus Schoenherr, 1825 c
 Cryptorhynchus argula Schoenherr, 1826 c
 Cryptorhynchus armigerus Cristofori & Jan, 1832 c
 Cryptorhynchus armipes Boheman, 1837 c
 Cryptorhynchus arnoldi Kirby, 1819 c
 Cryptorhynchus asper Boheman, 1837 c
 Cryptorhynchus asperatus Dejean, 1821 c
 Cryptorhynchus aspericollis Rosenschoeld, 1837 c
 Cryptorhynchus aspis Schoenherr, 1825 c
 Cryptorhynchus assimilans Walker, 1859 c
 Cryptorhynchus atricapillus  c
 Cryptorhynchus atrobrunneus Fiedler, 1941 c
 Cryptorhynchus atrofasciatus Fiedler, 1941 c
 Cryptorhynchus atromaculatus Fiedler, 1941 c
 Cryptorhynchus atroplagiatus Fiedler, 1941 c
 Cryptorhynchus atropos Boheman, 1844 c
 Cryptorhynchus auritarsis Sturm, 1826 c
 Cryptorhynchus austerus Boheman, 1837 c
 Cryptorhynchus australis Boisduval, 1835 c
 Cryptorhynchus aversandus Boheman, 1837 c
 Cryptorhynchus axillaris Sturm, 1826 c
 Cryptorhynchus balteatus Dejean, 1821 c
 Cryptorhynchus batatae Waterhouse, 1850 c
 Cryptorhynchus betulinus Klug, c
 Cryptorhynchus biangularis Rosenschoeld, 1837 c
 Cryptorhynchus bicaudatus Dejean, 1821 c
 Cryptorhynchus bicirculus Kirsch, 1869 c
 Cryptorhynchus bicoloratus Fiedler, 1941 c
 Cryptorhynchus bicostatus Sturm, 1826 c
 Cryptorhynchus bifasciatus Hope, c
 Cryptorhynchus biguttulus Fiedler, 1941 c
 Cryptorhynchus bilunaris Erichson, 1847 c
 Cryptorhynchus binotatus Schneider, 1828 c
 Cryptorhynchus biornatus Fiedler, 1941 c
 Cryptorhynchus bisignatus Say, 1831 c
 Cryptorhynchus bistrigirostris Boheman, 1837 c
 Cryptorhynchus bitrapezoides Fiedler, 1941 c
 Cryptorhynchus bitriangulum Fiedler, 1941 c
 Cryptorhynchus bituberculatus White, 1843 c
 Cryptorhynchus bohemani Boheman, 1837 c
 Cryptorhynchus bombina Dejean, 1821 c
 Cryptorhynchus bonsdorffii Rosenschoeld, 1837 c
 Cryptorhynchus borraginis Billberg, 1820 c
 Cryptorhynchus brevipes Sturm, 1826 c
 Cryptorhynchus brevirostris Fiedler, 1941 c
 Cryptorhynchus brevis Rosenschoeld, 1837 c
 Cryptorhynchus breyeri Brèthes, 1910 c
 Cryptorhynchus brunneus Fiedler, 1941 c
 Cryptorhynchus bullatus Germar, c
 Cryptorhynchus calcaratus Boheman, 1844 c
 Cryptorhynchus calidus Germar, 1824 c
 Cryptorhynchus camelus Dejean, 1821 c
 Cryptorhynchus capensis Dejean, c
 Cryptorhynchus capistratus Sturm, 1826 c
 Cryptorhynchus capucinus Chevrolat, 1880 c
 Cryptorhynchus carbonarius Sturm, 1826 c
 Cryptorhynchus carinatus Dejean, 1821 c
 Cryptorhynchus carinellus Boheman, 1837 c
 Cryptorhynchus cariosus Erichson, 1842 c
 Cryptorhynchus castigatus Boheman, 1837 c
 Cryptorhynchus caudex Boheman, 1837 c
 Cryptorhynchus cavernosus Boheman, 1837 c
 Cryptorhynchus cerdo Fiedler, 1941 c
 Cryptorhynchus cinctellus Rosenschoeld, 1837 c
 Cryptorhynchus cingillum Gyllenhal, 1837 c
 Cryptorhynchus cingulum Gemminger & Harold, 1871 c
 Cryptorhynchus circulus Boheman, 1837 c
 Cryptorhynchus clathratus Schoenherr, 1825 c g
 Cryptorhynchus clericus Chevrolat, 1880 c
 Cryptorhynchus clitellarius Boheman, 1837 c
 Cryptorhynchus clunifex Chevrolat, c
 Cryptorhynchus coecus Schoenherr, 1837 c
 Cryptorhynchus coloradensis Wickham, H.F., 1912 c g
 Cryptorhynchus compactus Dejean, 1821 c
 Cryptorhynchus compernis Germar, 1824 c
 Cryptorhynchus concretus Dejean, 1821 c
 Cryptorhynchus conicollis Boheman, 1844 c
 Cryptorhynchus consobrinus Rosenschoeld, 1837 c
 Cryptorhynchus cordifer Boheman, 1844 c
 Cryptorhynchus cordiger Suffrian, 1876 c
 Cryptorhynchus corosus Boisduval, 1835 c
 Cryptorhynchus corruscans Kirby, 1819 c
 Cryptorhynchus corticalis Boheman, 1837 c
 Cryptorhynchus coruscans Kirby, W., 1818 c
 Cryptorhynchus costatus Dejean, 1821 c
 Cryptorhynchus costicollis Dejean, 1821 c
 Cryptorhynchus costiger Schneider, 1828 c
 Cryptorhynchus crassipes Schneider, 1828 c
 Cryptorhynchus cribricollis Say, 1831 c
 Cryptorhynchus crinitarsis Sturm, 1826 c
 Cryptorhynchus cristatus Dejean, 1821 c
 Cryptorhynchus crucifer Brèthes, 1910 c
 Cryptorhynchus crudus Boheman, 1837 c
 Cryptorhynchus crux Billberg, 1820 c
 Cryptorhynchus cubae Boheman, 1844 c
 Cryptorhynchus cucullatus Rosenschoeld, 1837 c
 Cryptorhynchus cylindraceus Boheman, 1837 c
 Cryptorhynchus cylindricornis Germar, 1824 c
 Cryptorhynchus cynicus Sturm, 1826 c
 Cryptorhynchus declaratus Walker, 1859 c
 Cryptorhynchus definitus Boheman, 1837 c
 Cryptorhynchus degluptus Germar, 1824 c
 Cryptorhynchus delirus Boheman, 1837 c
 Cryptorhynchus delumbatus Rosenschoeld, 1837 c
 Cryptorhynchus delumbis Germar, 1824 c
 Cryptorhynchus dentatus Sturm, 1826 c
 Cryptorhynchus denticollis Germar, 1824 c
 Cryptorhynchus dentipes Dejean, 1821 c
 Cryptorhynchus denutatus Sturm, 1826 c
 Cryptorhynchus depressirostris Germar, 1824 c
 Cryptorhynchus diabolicus Fiedler, 1941 c
 Cryptorhynchus didymus Billberg, 1820 c
 Cryptorhynchus difficilis Boheman, 1837 c
 Cryptorhynchus difformis Dejean, 1821 c
 Cryptorhynchus dimidiatus Dejean, 1821 c
 Cryptorhynchus diocletianus Germar, 1824 c
 Cryptorhynchus discicollis Rosenschoeld, 1837 c
 Cryptorhynchus discretus Fiedler, 1941 c
 Cryptorhynchus divergens Germar, 1824 c
 Cryptorhynchus diversus Boheman, 1837 c
 Cryptorhynchus dorsalis Dejean, 1821 c
 Cryptorhynchus dromedarius Boisduval, 1835 c
 Cryptorhynchus dubius Fiedler, 1941 c
 Cryptorhynchus duplicatus Rosenschoeld, 1837 c
 Cryptorhynchus echii Billberg, 1820 c
 Cryptorhynchus echinatus Dejean, 1821 c
 Cryptorhynchus elegans Say, 1831 c
 Cryptorhynchus elevatus Dejean, 1821 c
 Cryptorhynchus eminens Cristofori & Jan, 1832 c
 Cryptorhynchus ephippiatus Boheman, 1844 c
 Cryptorhynchus ephippiger Boisduval, 1835 c
 Cryptorhynchus equestris Fiedler, 1941 c
 Cryptorhynchus erinaceus Schoenherr, 1837 c
 Cryptorhynchus exasperatus Sturm, 1826 c
 Cryptorhynchus excavatus Dejean, 1821 c
 Cryptorhynchus exsculpticollis Fiedler, 1941 c
 Cryptorhynchus exter Kuschel, 1955 c
 Cryptorhynchus fallii Wickham, H.F., 1912 c g
 Cryptorhynchus fasciatus Sturm, 1826 c
 Cryptorhynchus fasciculaticollis Marshall, 1930 c
 Cryptorhynchus fasciculatus Dejean, 1821 c
 Cryptorhynchus fasciculifer Boheman, 1844 c
 Cryptorhynchus fasciculosus Rosenschoeld, 1837 c
 Cryptorhynchus femoralis Erichson, 1842 c
 Cryptorhynchus ferratus Say, 1831 c
 Cryptorhynchus fictus Boheman, 1837 c
 Cryptorhynchus fiedleri Papp, 1979 c
 Cryptorhynchus figulinus Germar, c
 Cryptorhynchus flavescens Rosenschoeld, 1837 c
 Cryptorhynchus flavoscutellatus Boheman, 1844 c
 Cryptorhynchus foveaticollis Fiedler, 1941 c
 Cryptorhynchus foveatus Boheman, 1844 c
 Cryptorhynchus foveolatus Say, 1831 c
 Cryptorhynchus frigidus Schoenherr, 1837 c
 Cryptorhynchus frontalis Sturm, 1826 c g
 Cryptorhynchus fuliginosus Boisduval, 1835 c
 Cryptorhynchus fullo Steven, 1829 c
 Cryptorhynchus fumatus Sturm, 1826 c
 Cryptorhynchus fumosus Schneider, 1828 c
 Cryptorhynchus funebris Boheman, 1844 c
 Cryptorhynchus fuscatus LeConte, 1876 i g b
 Cryptorhynchus fuscus Sturm, 1826 c
 Cryptorhynchus gausapatus Boheman, 1837 c
 Cryptorhynchus gelasimus Boheman, 1837 c
 Cryptorhynchus geminatus Boheman, 1844 c
 Cryptorhynchus geminus Boheman, 1837 c
 Cryptorhynchus gentilis Fiedler, 1941 c
 Cryptorhynchus germari Boheman, 1837 c
 Cryptorhynchus gibber Dejean, 1821 c
 Cryptorhynchus gibbosus Cristofori & Jan, 1832 c
 Cryptorhynchus gibbus Schneider, 1828 c
 Cryptorhynchus globosus Dejean, 1821 c
 Cryptorhynchus gracilis Boheman, 1859 c
 Cryptorhynchus graminis Billberg, 1820 c
 Cryptorhynchus granosus Rosenschoeld, 1837 c
 Cryptorhynchus grisescens Sturm, 1826 c
 Cryptorhynchus griseus Sturm, 1826 c
 Cryptorhynchus grypus Illiger, c
 Cryptorhynchus guadelupensis Rosenschoeld, 1837 c
 Cryptorhynchus guadulpensis Boheman, 1844 c
 Cryptorhynchus guttifer Boheman, 1844 c
 Cryptorhynchus gypsi Oustalet, E., 1874 c g
 Cryptorhynchus haemorrhoes Schoenherr, 1825 c
 Cryptorhynchus harrisoni Pool, 1917 c
 Cryptorhynchus hebes Dejean, 1821 c
 Cryptorhynchus helvus LeConte, 1878 i g b
 Cryptorhynchus hexacanthus Germar, c
 Cryptorhynchus hirtus Cristofori & Jan, 1832 c
 Cryptorhynchus hispidulus Fiedler, 1941 c
 Cryptorhynchus hispidus Sturm, 1826 c
 Cryptorhynchus histrio Sturm, 1826 c
 Cryptorhynchus horridus Boheman, 1837 c
 Cryptorhynchus hospes Schoenherr, c
 Cryptorhynchus humeralis Gyllenhal, 1837 c
 Cryptorhynchus humilis Dejean, 1821 c
 Cryptorhynchus hurdi Zimmerman, 1972 c
 Cryptorhynchus hypocrita Dejean, 1821 c
 Cryptorhynchus illex Germar, 1824 c
 Cryptorhynchus illicitus Boheman, 1837 c
 Cryptorhynchus illotus Boheman, 1837 c
 Cryptorhynchus imbellis Germar, 1824 c
 Cryptorhynchus impexus Boheman, 1837 c
 Cryptorhynchus impluviatus Germar, 1824 c
 Cryptorhynchus impuratus Boheman, 1837 c
 Cryptorhynchus inaequalis Dejean, 1821 c
 Cryptorhynchus incertus Fiedler, 1941 c
 Cryptorhynchus indecorus Rosenschoeld, 1837 c
 Cryptorhynchus ineptus Boheman, 1837 c
 Cryptorhynchus infarctus Boheman, 1837 c
 Cryptorhynchus informis Germar, 1824 c
 Cryptorhynchus infulatus Erichson, 1842 c
 Cryptorhynchus inglorius Boheman, 1837 c
 Cryptorhynchus inquinatus Schoenherr, 1826 c
 Cryptorhynchus insanius Boheman, 1844 c
 Cryptorhynchus insubidus Germar, 1824 c
 Cryptorhynchus insularis Rosenschoeld, 1837 c
 Cryptorhynchus interruptus Dejean, 1821 c
 Cryptorhynchus interstitialis Chevrolat, 1880 c
 Cryptorhynchus irroratus Schoenherr, 1825 c
 Cryptorhynchus jamaicensis Germar, 1824 c
 Cryptorhynchus kerri Scudder, 1893 c
 Cryptorhynchus kunzei Boheman, 1844 c
 Cryptorhynchus lacunicollis Boheman, 1844 c
 Cryptorhynchus lapathi (Linnaeus, 1758) i c g b  (poplar-and-willow borer)
 Cryptorhynchus lateralis Sturm, 1826 c
 Cryptorhynchus leachii Kirby, 1819 c
 Cryptorhynchus lemniscatus Boheman, 1837 c
 Cryptorhynchus lemur Germar, 1824 c
 Cryptorhynchus lentiginosus Germar, 1824 c
 Cryptorhynchus lepidotus Boheman, 1837 c
 Cryptorhynchus leucocephalus Boheman, 1844 c
 Cryptorhynchus leucocoma Latreille, 1813 c
 Cryptorhynchus leucomelas Boheman, 1837 c
 Cryptorhynchus leucophaeus Erichson, 1847 c
 Cryptorhynchus levidipus Boheman, 1837 c
 Cryptorhynchus levipidus Boheman, 1844 c
 Cryptorhynchus linariae Billberg, 1820 c
 Cryptorhynchus lineatocollis Sturm, 1826 c
 Cryptorhynchus lineola Sturm, 1826 c
 Cryptorhynchus liratus Boheman, 1837 c
 Cryptorhynchus lirinus Boheman, 1844 c
 Cryptorhynchus lithodermus Boisduval, 1835 c
 Cryptorhynchus litura Billberg, 1820 c
 Cryptorhynchus longus Blatchley & Leng, 1916 c
 Cryptorhynchus luctuosus Boheman, 1837 c
 Cryptorhynchus lutosus LeConte, 1884 i g
 Cryptorhynchus macropus Dejean, 1821 c
 Cryptorhynchus maculatus Sturm, 1826 c
 Cryptorhynchus mamillatus Say, 1831 c
 Cryptorhynchus mangiferae Dejean, 1821 c
 Cryptorhynchus marci Boheman, 1844 c
 Cryptorhynchus marginatus Billberg, 1820 c
 Cryptorhynchus metallinus Schoenherr, 1825 c
 Cryptorhynchus miles Cristofori & Jan, 1832 c
 Cryptorhynchus miniatus Boheman, 1837 c
 Cryptorhynchus minutissimus LeConte, 1876 i g
 Cryptorhynchus misellus Boheman, 1837 c
 Cryptorhynchus mitis Germar, 1824 c
 Cryptorhynchus modestus Dejean, 1821 c
 Cryptorhynchus moestus Boheman, 1844 c
 Cryptorhynchus monachus Boisduval, 1835 c
 Cryptorhynchus morbillosus Dejean, 1821 c
 Cryptorhynchus morio Boheman, 1837 c
 Cryptorhynchus muriceus Germar, 1824 c
 Cryptorhynchus mutabilis Boheman, 1837 c
 Cryptorhynchus nasutus Fiedler, 1941 c
 Cryptorhynchus nebulosus Dejean, 1821 c
 Cryptorhynchus nenuphar Sturm, 1826 c
 Cryptorhynchus nigridorsis Sturm, 1826 c
 Cryptorhynchus nigrobrunneus Fiedler, 1941 c
 Cryptorhynchus nigromaculatus Fiedler, 1941 c
 Cryptorhynchus nitidulus Brèthes, 1910 c
 Cryptorhynchus niveifrons Schoenherr, 1845 c
 Cryptorhynchus nodulosus Sturm, 1826 c
 Cryptorhynchus nota Sturm, 1826 c
 Cryptorhynchus notabilis Walker, 1858 c
 Cryptorhynchus novalis Schoenherr, 1826 c
 Cryptorhynchus nubifer Boheman, 1837 c
 Cryptorhynchus nubilus Schneider, 1829 c
 Cryptorhynchus nudirostris Rosenschoeld, 1837 c
 Cryptorhynchus obliquefasciatus Boheman, 1844 c
 Cryptorhynchus obliquus Say, 1831 i c b
 Cryptorhynchus obsoletus Dejean, 1821 c
 Cryptorhynchus occatus Germar, 1824 c
 Cryptorhynchus ocellopunctatus Thomson, 1858 c
 Cryptorhynchus ochraceus Boheman, 1844 c
 Cryptorhynchus ochroleucus Germar, 1824 c
 Cryptorhynchus oculatus Say, 1824 c
 Cryptorhynchus opacus Fiedler, 1941 g
 Cryptorhynchus operculatus Say, 1824 c
 Cryptorhynchus orthodoxus Chevrolat, 1880 c
 Cryptorhynchus orthomastius Germar, 1824 c
 Cryptorhynchus otiosus Boheman, 1837 c
 Cryptorhynchus pallidicornis Chevrolat, 1880 c
 Cryptorhynchus palmacollis Say, 1831 c
 Cryptorhynchus palpebra Schoenherr, 1826 c
 Cryptorhynchus panchezi Hustache, 1936 c
 Cryptorhynchus papuanus Heller, 1916 c
 Cryptorhynchus pardalinus Dejean, 1821 c
 Cryptorhynchus pauper Fiedler, 1941 c
 Cryptorhynchus pavefactus Boheman, 1837 c
 Cryptorhynchus pectorestriatus Chevrolat, c
 Cryptorhynchus perforatus Boheman, 1837 c
 Cryptorhynchus perinsignis Boheman, 1837 c
 Cryptorhynchus pertusus Boheman, 1844 c
 Cryptorhynchus piger Schoenherr, 1825 c
 Cryptorhynchus pilipes Schoenherr, 1825 c
 Cryptorhynchus pilosellus Boheman, 1844 c
 Cryptorhynchus pilosus Dejean, 1835 c
 Cryptorhynchus pinguis Fiedler, 1941 c
 Cryptorhynchus plagiatus Rosenschoeld, 1837 c
 Cryptorhynchus plagifer Boheman, 1844 c
 Cryptorhynchus planatus Fairmaire, 1849 c
 Cryptorhynchus planicollis Fiedler, 1941 c
 Cryptorhynchus planidorsis Thomson, 1858 c
 Cryptorhynchus planirostris Sturm, 1826 c
 Cryptorhynchus plumipes Champion, 1906 c
 Cryptorhynchus podagrosus Germar, 1824 c
 Cryptorhynchus poecilus Fiedler, 1941 c
 Cryptorhynchus pollinarius Billberg, 1820 c
 Cryptorhynchus pollinosus Dejean, 1821 c
 Cryptorhynchus porcatus Dejean, 1821 c
 Cryptorhynchus porcinus Dejean, 1821 c
 Cryptorhynchus porculeti Germar, 1824 c
 Cryptorhynchus porcus Schneider, 1828 c
 Cryptorhynchus porifer Rosenschoeld, 1837 c
 Cryptorhynchus porosus Boheman, 1837 c
 Cryptorhynchus porriginosus Germar, 1824 c
 Cryptorhynchus postfasciatus Fairmaire, 1849 c
 Cryptorhynchus posthumus Boheman, 1844 c
 Cryptorhynchus posticatus Say, 1831 c
 Cryptorhynchus posticus Boheman, 1844 c
 Cryptorhynchus postularius Boheman, 1844 c
 Cryptorhynchus profusus Scudder, 1893 c
 Cryptorhynchus protensus Fiedler, 1954 g
 Cryptorhynchus pudens Schoenherr, 1844 c
 Cryptorhynchus pumilus Boheman, 1837 c
 Cryptorhynchus punctulatus Sturm, c
 Cryptorhynchus pusio Schoenherr, 1837 c
 Cryptorhynchus pustulatus Sturm, c
 Cryptorhynchus quadrifoveatus Chevrolat, 1880 c
 Cryptorhynchus quadripunctatus Chevrolat, 1880 c
 Cryptorhynchus quadrivittatus Schoenherr, 1844 c
 Cryptorhynchus quercicola Billberg, 1820 c
 Cryptorhynchus querulus Boheman, 1837 c
 Cryptorhynchus raucus Dejean, 1821 c
 Cryptorhynchus ravus Boheman, 1844 c
 Cryptorhynchus reichei Boheman, 1844 c
 Cryptorhynchus renudus Heyden, C. von, 1862 c g
 Cryptorhynchus retentus Say, 1831 c
 Cryptorhynchus retusus Boheman, 1844 c
 Cryptorhynchus rhinoceros Chevrolat, c
 Cryptorhynchus rigidus Rosenschoeld, 1837 c
 Cryptorhynchus roboris Curtis, 1829 c
 Cryptorhynchus rotundicollis Boheman, 1844 c
 Cryptorhynchus rubiginosus Dejean, 1821 c
 Cryptorhynchus rudis Rosenschoeld, 1837 c
 Cryptorhynchus ruficornis Sturm, 1826 c
 Cryptorhynchus rufoapicalis Fiedler, 1941 c
 Cryptorhynchus rufoscapularis Fiedler, 1941 c
 Cryptorhynchus rugatus Dejean, 1821 c
 Cryptorhynchus rugicollis Wibmer & O'Brien, 1986 c
 Cryptorhynchus rugulosus Billberg, 1820 c
 Cryptorhynchus rusticus Dejean, 1821 c
 Cryptorhynchus salicorniae Dejean, 1821 c
 Cryptorhynchus sanguinicollis Germar, E.F., 1824 c
 Cryptorhynchus scabratus Dejean, 1821 c
 Cryptorhynchus scapularis Rosenschoeld, 1837 c
 Cryptorhynchus sceleratus Boheman, 1837 c
 Cryptorhynchus schwarzi Blatchley & Leng, 1916 c
 Cryptorhynchus scorpio Dejean, 1821 c
 Cryptorhynchus scotias Germar, c
 Cryptorhynchus scrobiculatus Motschulsky, 1853 c
 Cryptorhynchus scutellaris Fiedler, 1941 c
 Cryptorhynchus scutellatus Fiedler, 1941 c
 Cryptorhynchus sellatus Dejean, 1821 c
 Cryptorhynchus semicinctus Fiedler, 1941 c
 Cryptorhynchus semicircularis Champion, 1906 c
 Cryptorhynchus semicostatus Germar, 1824 c
 Cryptorhynchus senilis Schneider, 1828 c
 Cryptorhynchus septemtuberculatus Schoenherr, 1837 c
 Cryptorhynchus serius Rosenschoeld, 1837 c
 Cryptorhynchus serratus Germar, 1824 c
 Cryptorhynchus setarius Thomson, 1858 c
 Cryptorhynchus setifer Boh. in Schoenh., 1844 c
 Cryptorhynchus setiferus Boheman, 1844 c
 Cryptorhynchus setiger Boheman, 1837 c
 Cryptorhynchus setosus Sturm, 1826 c
 Cryptorhynchus sexlineatus Boheman, 1837 c
 Cryptorhynchus sextuberculatus Schoenherr, 1837 c
 Cryptorhynchus signatus Sturm, 1826 c
 Cryptorhynchus signifer Boheman, 1837 c
 Cryptorhynchus signum Sturm, 1826 c
 Cryptorhynchus simulatus Boheman, 1844 c
 Cryptorhynchus sirius Erichson, 1842 c
 Cryptorhynchus soleatus Germar, 1824 c
 Cryptorhynchus solidus Erichson, 1842 c
 Cryptorhynchus sordidulus Boheman, 1837 c
 Cryptorhynchus sparsipes Germar, 1824 c
 Cryptorhynchus spiculator Latreille, 1809 c
 Cryptorhynchus spiralis Fiedler, 1941 c
 Cryptorhynchus squalidus Dejean, c
 Cryptorhynchus statua Germar, 1822 c
 Cryptorhynchus stephensi Hope, c
 Cryptorhynchus sticticus Germar, 1824 c
 Cryptorhynchus stigma Dejean, 1821 c
 Cryptorhynchus stigmaticollis Dejean, c
 Cryptorhynchus stipator Boheman, 1837 c
 Cryptorhynchus stipitosus Sturm, 1826 c
 Cryptorhynchus stipulator Schoenherr, 1844 c
 Cryptorhynchus strangulatus Boheman, 1844 c
 Cryptorhynchus strictus Rosenschoeld, 1837 c
 Cryptorhynchus striga Guerin-Meneville, 1831 c
 Cryptorhynchus stultus (Fabricius, J.C., 1787) c g
 Cryptorhynchus subcarinatus Fiedler, 1941 c
 Cryptorhynchus subfasciatus Fiedler, 1941 c
 Cryptorhynchus subgibbosus Fiedler, 1941 c
 Cryptorhynchus submixtus Fiedler, 1941 c
 Cryptorhynchus subnotatus Boheman, 1837 c
 Cryptorhynchus subtuberculatus Fiedler, 1941 c
 Cryptorhynchus succisus Erichson, 1842 c
 Cryptorhynchus sulcicollis Billberg, 1820 c
 Cryptorhynchus superbus Dejean, 1821 c
 Cryptorhynchus suturalis Germar, 1821 c
 Cryptorhynchus terminatus Klug, c
 Cryptorhynchus tesselatus Dejean, 1821 c
 Cryptorhynchus tibialis Schoenherr, 1825 c
 Cryptorhynchus tirunculus Boheman, 1837 c
 Cryptorhynchus torpescus Rosenschoeld, 1837 c
 Cryptorhynchus torvus Schoenherr, c
 Cryptorhynchus triangularis Boheman, 1837 c
 Cryptorhynchus tribulosus Boheman, 1844 c
 Cryptorhynchus trilineatus Sturm, 1826 c
 Cryptorhynchus triloratus Germar, c
 Cryptorhynchus trimaculatus Billberg, 1820 c
 Cryptorhynchus tristis LeConte, 1876 i c g b
 Cryptorhynchus troglodytes Billberg, 1820 c
 Cryptorhynchus tuberculatus Sturm, 1826 c
 Cryptorhynchus tubulatus Say, 1831 c
 Cryptorhynchus turpiculus Boheman, 1837 c
 Cryptorhynchus typhae Illiger, c
 Cryptorhynchus umbrinus Fiedler, 1941 c
 Cryptorhynchus umbrosus Boheman, 1837 c
 Cryptorhynchus unicolor Rosenschoeld, 1837 c
 Cryptorhynchus urens Hoffmannsegg, c
 Cryptorhynchus uroleucus Fiedler, 1941 c
 Cryptorhynchus vacca Sturm, 1826 c
 Cryptorhynchus vacillatus Boheman, 1837 c
 Cryptorhynchus vaginalis Dejean, 1821 c
 Cryptorhynchus variolosus Dejean, 1821 c
 Cryptorhynchus varipes Schoenherr, 1825 c
 Cryptorhynchus verruca Schoenherr, 1837 c
 Cryptorhynchus vestitus Rosenschoeld, 1837 c
 Cryptorhynchus woodruffi (Sleeper, 1955) i c
 Cryptorhynchus ypsilon Boheman, 1837 c

Data sources: i = ITIS, c = Catalogue of Life, g = GBIF, b = Bugguide.net

References

Cryptorhynchus